Andrew Francis McBride (4 January 1869 - 1946) was a physician and Mayor of Paterson, New Jersey from 1908 to 1913. There is a statue of him alongside those of Alexander Hamilton, Garret Hobart and Nathan Barnert, outside of Paterson City Hall. He was elected as a Democrat. He was New Jersey Labor Commissioner.

He was born on 4 January 1869 in Paterson, New Jersey to Hugh McBride of Ireland.

References

1869 births
1946 deaths
Mayors of Paterson, New Jersey
Physicians from New Jersey
State cabinet secretaries of New Jersey
State labor commissioners in the United States
New Jersey Democrats